The Netherlands was a minor country in World War II. It surrendered in 5 days after the start of hostilities, but the Germans were impressed by the tenacity of resistance. Evading capture, most officers escaped to Great Britain, continuing to resist the Germans. This article is based on one source, which lists and numbers regiments of the Dutch Armed Forces.

Structure of a Division 
This is the structure of a Infantry Division in 1940 of the Dutch Armed Forces:

3 Regiments (Each with the full capacity of 2,691 men)

324 Machine Guns (216 Light M20, 108 Schwarzlose M08/15)

18 Heavy Mortars

12 Anti-tank guns

32 Artillery pieces

Regiments 
There were 48 Infantry Regiments and 27 Artillery Regiments of the Dutch Armed Forces of 1940. 3 regiments in turn formed a Division. And two divisions and two artillery regiments formed an Army Corps. Over 90% of the Dutch Army was conscripts, with just about 250,000 men in total to resist the Germans. There were also three infantry battalions, each with the strength of 5,000 men.

Field Army 
Infantry Regiments from 1 through 24, and Artillery Regiments from 1 through 12 formed the bulk of the Army in the field. The regiments in the Field Army were the best equipped, and were made up in numbers mostly of young conscripts.

Infantry Regiments 
1st Infantry Regiment

2nd Infantry Regiment

3rd Infantry Regiment

4th Infantry Regiment

5th Infantry Regiment

6th Infantry Regiment

7th Infantry Regiment

8th Infantry Regiment

9th Infantry Regiment

10th Infantry Regiment

11th Infantry Regiment

12th Infantry Regiment

13th Infantry Regiment

14th Infantry Regiment

15th Infantry Regiment

16th Infantry Regiment

17th Infantry Regiment

18th Infantry Regiment

19th Infantry Regiment

20th Infantry Regiment

21st Infantry Regiment

22nd Infantry Regiment

23rd Infantry Regiment

24th Infantry Regiment

Artillery Regiments 
1st Artillery Regiment

2nd Artillery Regiment

3rd Artillery Regiment

4th Artillery Regiment

5th Artillery Regiment

6th Artillery Regiment

7th Artillery Regiment

8th Artillery Regiment

9th Artillery Regiment

10th Artillery Regiment

11th Artillery Regiment

12th Artillery Regiment

Reserve Regiments 
These regiments serve as reserve, training, and garrisons across the Netherlands. Infantry regiments from 25 through 48 fill the reserve, also with artillery regiments from 13 through 27.

Infantry Regiments 
25th Infantry Regiment

26th Infantry Regiment

27th Infantry Regiment

28th Infantry Regiment

29th Infantry Regiment

30th Infantry Regiment

31st Infantry Regiment

32nd Infantry Regiment

33rd Infantry Regiment

34th Infantry Regiment

35th Infantry Regiment

36th Infantry Regiment

37th Infantry Regiment

38th Infantry Regiment

39th Infantry Regiment

40th Infantry Regiment

41st Infantry Regiment

42nd Infantry Regiment

43rd Infantry Regiment

44th Infantry Regiment

45th Infantry Regiment

46th Infantry Regiment

47th Infantry Regiment

48th Infantry Regiment

Artillery Regiments 
12th Artillery Regiment

13th Artillery Regiment

14th Artillery Regiment

15th Artillery Regiment

16th Artillery Regiment

17th Artillery Regiment

18th Artillery Regiment

19th Artillery Regiment

20th Artillery Regiment

21st Artillery Regiment

22nd Artillery Regiment

23rd Artillery Regiment

24th Artillery Regiment

25th Artillery Regiment

26th Artillery Regiment

27th Artillery Regiment

Border Infantry Units 
With 25 Battalions and 16 companies, the Border Infantry were Infantry that were deployed to slow down a German attack, if the Dutch government hadn’t finished mobilization in 1940, at least some resistance can be made. The Border Infantry were deployed along the Dutch coast, along with a few garrisons on the islands. Most of the Border Infantry were deployed on the Southern border between Germany and Belgium. A border Infantry company or battalion can be better equipped than an average Infantry Battalion. The total number of personnel is around 20,000.

Battalions 
1st Border Infantry Battalion

2nd Border Infantry Battalion

3rd Border Infantry Battalion

4th Border Infantry Battalion

5th Border Infantry Battalion

6th Border Infantry Battalion

7th Border Infantry Battalion

8th Border Infantry Battalion

9th Border Infantry Battalion

10th Border Infantry Battalion

11th Border Infantry Battalion

12th Border Infantry Battalion

13th Border Infantry Battalion

14th Border Infantry Battalion

15th Border Infantry Battalion

16th Border Infantry Battalion

17th Border Infantry Battalion

18th Border Infantry Battalion

19th Border Infantry Battalion

20th Border Infantry Battalion

21st Border Infantry Battalion

22nd Border Infantry Battalion

23rd Border Infantry Battalion

24th Border Infantry Battalion

25th Border Infantry Battalion

Companies 
The Dutch had to resort to company sized forces when conscripts were in short supply. There were 16 companies.

1st Border Infantry Company

2nd Border Infantry Company

3rd Border Infantry Company

4th Border Infantry Company

5th Border Infantry Company

6th Border Infantry Company

7th Border Infantry Company

8th Border Infantry Company

9th Border Infantry Company

10th Border Infantry Company

11th Border Infantry Company

12th Border Infantry Company

13th Border Infantry Company

14th Border Infantry Company

15th Border Infantry Company

16th Border Infantry Company

General References 

Regiments of World War II
Regiments of the Netherlands
Dutch